Joseph Lindley Scales,  (25 July 1895 – 29 July 1967) was an Australian soldier and Australian rules footballer who played with Fitzroy and St Kilda in the Victorian Football League (VFL).

Born in Mitta Mitta, Victoria, Scales joined the Australian Imperial Force on 1 February 1915 for service in the First World War. He was awarded the Military Medal for leading a daylight patrol and gathering valuable intelligence at Bapaume in March 1917 and was commissioned a second lieutenant the following month. At Poelcappelle in October, he led a platoon with "conspicuous gallantry" and singlehandedly cleared a German machine-gun post, for which he was recommended for the Victoria Cross. He was instead awarded the Distinguished Service Order. Scales was subsequently Mentioned in Despatches and, with the war over, returned to Australia in July 1919 and soon after relinquished his commission. He returned to service in the Second World War, rising to the rank of captain while posted to Headquarters, Australian Military Forces.

Notes

External links

1895 births
1967 deaths
Australian Army officers
Australian Companions of the Distinguished Service Order
Australian military personnel of World War I
Australian military personnel of World War II
Australian recipients of the Military Medal
Australian rules footballers from Victoria (Australia)
Fitzroy Football Club players
St Kilda Football Club players
Military personnel from Victoria (Australia)